Blankenship Farm is a historic home and barn located near Ellett, Montgomery County, Virginia.  The farmhouse was built around 1929, and is a three-bay, two-story, brick, hipped roofed, American Foursquare-style dwelling. In addition to the farmhouse, there is a contributing fourteen-sided frame barn on a poured concrete foundation. It has a concrete floor and is sided with German or novelty weatherboard.

It was listed on the National Register of Historic Places in 1989.

Its 14-sided barn is a round barn.

References

Houses on the National Register of Historic Places in Virginia
Barns on the National Register of Historic Places in Virginia
Houses completed in 1929
Houses in Montgomery County, Virginia
National Register of Historic Places in Montgomery County, Virginia
Barns in Virginia
Round barns in Virginia